A Spire for Mansfield, also shortened to A-Spire is a 13-metre (42.7-foot) sculpture, which lies within the centre of Mansfield, Nottinghamshire, England. It was officially endorsed by the former local mayor Tony Egginton and Mansfield District Council. The sculpture was installed in late 2007, as the third piece of artwork for public art in Mansfield and appears as a large metallic feather.

The sculpture was created by two artists; Wolfgang Buttress and Heron, and was intended to mark the legacy of local coal mining, the canaries once taken underground, Sherwood Forest in Nottinghamshire, and Mansfield's engineering traditions.

The tines of the feather were cut by laser from 3mm stainless steel and were meant to "capture the breeze" and allow the sculpture to gently sway, portraying the branches of a tree. The highly polished stainless steel aimed to reflect the light and act as "a counterpart to the surrounding trees".

See also
Art fabrication

References

Outdoor sculptures in England
Mansfield
2007 sculptures
Steel sculptures in England